Chilton Saint James School is a private single-sex girls composite school located in central Lower Hutt, New Zealand. The school was founded in 1918 by Geraldine FitzGerald, and was a combined day and boarding school until the dormitories closed in the late 1970s. Chilton St James has a roll of  students from Years 1 to 13 (ages 5 to 18) as of   The school also has a co-educational preschool for boys and girls from the age of 2.

In 2018 Chilton introduced the Cambridge curriculum. Alongside this change they open the Chilton Ballet Academy (CBA), a co-ed dance training school that prepares young dancers to break into the industry. In 2020, the school also opened the Co-ed Chilton Music School (CMS) as a musical program to help prepared students who want to go into the music industry. The school runs the Chilton Dance Centre, which provides afterschool dance lessons and training in classical ballet, jazz, hip hop, contemporary, lyrical, tap, musical theatre dance and pilates to students from Preschool to Adults.

Enrolment
As a private school, Chilton St James receives little funding from the government and charges parents of students tuition fees to cover costs. As of 2013, the school fees range from NZ$12,732 for Year 1–3 student to $17,080 for Year 9–13 students, inclusive of GST. A 7.5% fee discount applies if a student has one or more siblings also attending the school. Fees for international students are higher.

At the March 2013 Education Review Office (ERO) review, Chilton St James had 420 students, including four international students. 63% as New Zealand European (Pākehā), 9% as other European, 16% as Asian (including 5% as Indian), 6% as Māori, 3% as Pacific Islanders, and 4% as other ethnicities.

The school has a socio-economic decile of 10, meaning the school draws its students mainly from areas of little or no socio-economic deprivation.

Notable staff
 Alice Candy, historian
 Vera Chapman, artist

Notable alumnae

 Teresa Bergman, singer-songwriter-guitarist
Stefania Owen, actress (Running Wilde, The Carrie Diaries)
Peggy Spicer, artist
 Honor Carter (née Dillon), New Zealand field hockey player

References

External links

Educational institutions established in 1918
Girls' schools in New Zealand
International Baccalaureate schools in New Zealand
Private schools in New Zealand
Schools in Lower Hutt
Secondary schools in the Wellington Region
1918 establishments in New Zealand
Alliance of Girls' Schools Australasia